This is a list of winners and nominees of the Billboard Music Award for Top Rap Album. Notable winners include The Marshall Mathers LP 2, Recovery, and Views. Eminem and Drake are the only rappers to have won the award more than once.

Winners and Nominees

Most Wins and Nominations

The following individuals received two or more Top Rap Album Awards:

The following individuals received two or more Top Rap Album nominations:

References

Billboard awards
Album awards